Ulama is a ball game played in Mexico, currently experiencing a revival from its home in a few communities in the state of Sinaloa. As a descendant of the Aztec version of the Mesoamerican ballgame, the game is regarded as one of the oldest continuously played sports in the world and as the oldest known game using a rubber ball.

History

The word ulama comes from the Nahuatl word  ōllamaliztli  from ōllama  (playing of a game with a ball), related to the word ōlli  (rubber, rubber ball).  Ōllamaliztli was the Aztec name for the Mesoamerican ballgame (meaning roughly the process of playing the ball game), whose roots extended back to at least the 2nd millennium BC and evidence of which has been found in nearly all Mesoamerican cultures in an area extending from modern-day Mexico to El Salvador, and possibly in modern-day Arizona and New Mexico. Archaeologists have uncovered rubber balls dating to at least 1600 BC, ballgamer figures from at least 1200 BC, and nearly 1500 ancient ball courts.

Due to its religious and ritual aspects, Spanish Catholics suppressed the game soon after the Spanish conquest. It survived in areas such as Sinaloa, where Spanish influence was less pervasive.

As part of its nationwide revival, the game now has a home in the capital Mexico City, at a cultural centre in the Azcapotzalco neighbourhood.

Ulama
Ulama games are played on a temporary court called a tastei (from tlachtli , the Nahuatl word meaning "ballcourt").  The bounds of these long narrow courts are made by drawing or chalking thick lines in the dirt. The courts are divided into opposing sides by a center line, called an analco. A ball that is allowed to cross the end line, the chichi or chivo, will result in a point scored for the opposing team. Points or rayas ("lines", so named for the tally marks used to keep score) are gained in play. The scoring system provides for resetting the score to zero under certain conditions, which can make for lengthy games.

The modern-day game has three main forms:

Ulama de cadera or hip ulama. A hip ulama team consists of five or more players (but there could be as many as twelve) wearing loincloths, with leather hip pads for some protection against the heavy (3-4 kg, around 7-9 lb) rubber ball.  
Ulama de antebrazo or forearm ulama. Played on a smaller field, with teams of one to three players and a ball lighter than that of hip ulama, the games requires the players to return the ball using their wrapped forearm. Women often play this game.
Ulama de mazo or Ulamad de palo, in which a heavy (6–7 kg or 13-15 lb) two-handed wooden paddle strikes a 500g (1 lb) ball, usually in teams of three or four.

The object of the game is to keep the ball in play and in-bounds. Depending on the score and the local variant of the rules, the ball is played either high or low. A team scores a point when a player of the opposing team hits the ball out of turn, misses the ball, knocks the ball out of bounds, touches the ball with any part of the body aside from the hip, accidentally touches a teammate, lets the ball stop moving before it reaches the center line, or even if they fail to announce the score after they have scored a point.

The first team that scores eight points wins. If both teams end up having the same number of points after a turn, both sides begin again from zero. One record-setting game reportedly lasted for eight days. Most modern games are stopped after about two hours.

Ulama balls
See also Mesoamerican rubber balls

See also
 Batey (game)
 Pelota purépecha

Notes

References
 Ulama, accessed October 2007.
 (1978) Ulama, the Perpetuation in Mexico of the Pre-Spanish Ball Game Ullamaliztli. Leiden.

External links

 The Mesoamerican Ballgame Ulama
 Article on Ulama from the Smithsonian Institution (archived by Wayback Machine)

Mesoamerican sports
Ball games
Team sports
Ancient sports
Sport in Mexico
Sports originating in Mexico
Aztec

pt:Tlachtli